At , the Achtermannshöhe (also just called the Achtermann) in the Harz National Park is the third highest mountain in Lower Saxony and the fourth highest in the Harz mountains.

It lies in the unparished area of Harz between the Harz-Heide route (B 4) and the old Inner German Border about 6 km north of Braunlage. Its summit, covered with loose boulders, stands proud of the surrounding trees and offers a superb all-round view. Equally its characteristic rounded hilltop or Kuppe is visible in good weather from many other points in the Harz.

The Achtermann may be accessed by paths leading from Oderbrück and Königskrug.

Geology 
The base of the Achtermannshöhe is part of the granite massif of the Brocken, which extends across a wide area between Wurmberg, Torfhaus and Elend. By contrast, the rocky, treeless Kuppe of the Achtermann comprises hornfels, a contact metamorphic rock. The hornstone on the summit has a depth of about 
10 m and was formed from Grauwacke as it was heated during the intrusion of granitic magma.

History 
Earlier names include Uchteneshoge and Uchtenhoch.

Hiking 
The Achtermannshöhe is checkpoint no. 12 in the network of ‘stamp’ checkpoints on the Harz Wandernadel route.

See also 
 List of mountains and hills of Lower Saxony
 List of mountains of the Harz

References 

Mountains of Lower Saxony
Mountains of the Harz
Braunlage
Mountains under 1000 metres